Antonio Gutiérrez de la Fuente (8 September 1796 – 14 March 1878) was a Peruvian politician who also served in the Peruvian military. He briefly served as President of Peru from June 7 to September 1, 1829.

Gutiérrez de la Fuente was born in the silver-mining town of Huantajaya, Tarapacá, Peru (now Chile), in 1796. He was an officer in the Spanish forces, before joining the rebellion for independence. Strong partisan of Simón Bolívar they supported the 1823 coup.

De la Fuente and Agustín Gamarra were made governors of southern States after Peruvian independence, with de la Fuente in charge of Arequipa. In 1826 they considered separating from Peru, but instead lead the movement to overthrow the government of José de La Mar with de la Fuente being named Vice President of Peru and taking the position of the President of the Republic until the General Agustín Gamarra succeeded him. Gutiérrez de la Fuente served as the Vice President of Peru from 1 September 1829 to 16 April 1831.

He served as the President of the Senate in 1849 and from 1851 to 1853.

He died in Lima in 1878.

References 

1796 births
1878 deaths
Presidents of Peru
Vice presidents of Peru
Presidents of the Senate of Peru
Peruvian people of Spanish descent